Stefan de Walden was a Polish military commander and engineer.

He participated in the fights of the Riverine Flotilla of the Polish Navy during the Polish-Bolshevik War. During the Invasion of Poland of 1939, he served as the commanding officer of Wicher, a destroyer of the Polish Navy which took part in the Battle of the Gdańsk Bay. After the war, since 1947, he headed the Historical Detachment of the Naval Staff of Poland.

References 

Polish military personnel of World War II
Polish Navy officers
Prisoners of Oflag II-C